Tuskegee (YTB-806) was a United States Navy  named for Tuskegee, Alabama.

Construction

The contract for Tuskegee was awarded 4 March 1969. She was laid down on 25 September 1969 at Sturgeon Bay, Wisconsin, by Peterson Builders and launched 15 April 1970.

Operational history

Tuskegee served the 14th Naval District at Pearl Harbor, Hawaii for her entire career.

Stricken from the Navy List 26 April 2006, ex-Tuskegee was sold by Defense Reutilization and Marketing Service (DRMS) for reuse or conversion, 11 February 2008.

References

External links
 

 

Natick-class large harbor tugs
Ships built by Peterson Builders
1970 ships